Bird Haven is a historic home located at Charleston, West Virginia.  It was built about 1895, by Israel N. Johnson, who owned a tailor business and served as state ornithologist for West Virginia.  This two-story bungalow-style cottage is of painted clapboards.

It was listed on the National Register of Historic Places in 1984 as part of the South Hills Multiple Resource Area.

References

American Craftsman architecture in West Virginia
Houses in Charleston, West Virginia
Bungalow architecture in West Virginia
Houses completed in 1895
Houses on the National Register of Historic Places in West Virginia
National Register of Historic Places in Charleston, West Virginia
Victorian architecture in West Virginia